Dennis Flinta (born 14 November 1983) is a retired Danish professional football midfielder.

Career
Flinta started his career with a number of Copenhagen clubs. He played in the reserve team of Brøndby IF, but did not play any senior matches for the club. In 2004, he moved to Silkeborg IF, and made his Danish Superliga debut. He had a short spell at league rivals FC Midtjylland, before moving back to Silkeborg, now in the secondary Danish 1st Division. He helped Silkeborg gain promotion for the Superliga.

At the end of 2019, Flinta announced his retirement at the age of 36. With a total of 386 games played for Silkeborg, he became the second most playing player in the club's history.

References

External links

 Brøndby IF profile 
 Official Danish Superliga stats 

1983 births
Living people
Danish men's footballers
Silkeborg IF players
FC Midtjylland players
Danish Superliga players
Association football midfielders
BK Avarta players